Henriette Hansen may refer to:
 Henriette Hansen (actress) (1814–1892), Norwegian stage actress, opera singer and ballet dancer
 Henriette Hansen (cricketer), Danish cricketer
 Henriette Hansen (handballer) (born 1998), Danish handball player
 Henriette Engel Hansen (born 1982), Danish canoeist

See also
 Henriette Bonde-Hansen (born 1963), Danish operatic soprano